Shut Your Mouth may refer to:

 Shut Your Mouth (album), a 2000 album by Frenzal Rhomb
 "Shut Your Mouth" (Garbage song), 2001
 "Shut Your Mouth", a 2002 song by Pain
 "Shut Your Mouth", a song by Made in London
 "Shut Your Mouth", a song by Motörhead from the 2002 album Hammered
 Shut Yo' Mouth!, a 1981 album by jazz bassist Slam Stewart

See also 
Shut Your Mouth and Open Your Eyes, a 1998 album by AFI
Shut up
World Shut Your Mouth (disambiguation)
WWE SmackDown! Shut Your Mouth, a 2002 professional wrestling video game